The Ministry of Finance, Economic Stabilization and National Policies (also known as the Finance Ministry or the Treasury) is a cabinet ministry of the Government of Sri Lanka responsible for developing and executing the  government's public finance policy, economic policy and long term 
fiscal planning. The Treasury is housed at the General Treasury Building (also referred to as The Secretariat) in Fort.

History 
Although the post Treasurer of Ceylon of the British Government of Ceylon dates back to the early nineteenth century and was succeeded by the post of Financial Secretary of Ceylon under the recommendations of the Donoughmore Commission. The post of Ministry of Finance and the Treasury of Ceylon was established in 1947 under the recommendations of the Soulbury Commission under the Ceylon Independence Act, 1947 and The Ceylon (Constitution and Independence) Orders in Council 1947. A young J.R Jayawardena, became the first Minister of Finance of independence Ceylon. Over time the Ministry took over the policy planning which it currently undertakes.

Senior officials
 Minister of Finance, Economic Stabilization and National Policies  - Ranil Wickremesinghe President
 Secretary to the Treasury -  Mr. K M Mahinda Siriwardana

Treasury departments
Department of Project Management and Monitoring  
National Planning Department
External Resources Department
National Budget Department
Public Enterprises Department
Management Services Department
Fiscal Policy Department
Trade, Tariff & Investment Policy Department
Development Finance Department
Public Finance Department
Legal Affairs Department
Treasury Operations Department
State Accounts Department
Management Audit Department.

Secretary of the Treasury 
The position of Secretary to the Treasury is rooted in the post of Financial Secretary of the colonial Government of Ceylon this itself originated from the post of Treasurer of the colonial government. Appointments were made from the members of the British Civil Service and later from the Ceylon Civil Service. It was one of three the key government colonial posts, the others being Colonial Secretary and Law Secretary. The post of Financial Secretary came second in the order precedence after Colonial Secretary or Chief Secretary as the post was known.

Following independence in 1947 and the official post of Secretary of Treasury, with appointment begin of grade of an Permanent Secretary and to the most senior member and head of the Ceylon Civil Service. Most appointments in the recent past have been for persons who have not been the career civil servants and the post is concurrently held with that of Permanent Secretary of the Ministry of Finance.
        
 Sir Charles Ernest Jones, CMG, CCS (29.09.1947 – 12.12.1950) 
 Theodore Duncan Perera, CMG, CCS  (13.12.1950 – 12.03.1951)
 Sir Arthur Godwin Ranasinha, CMG, CBE, CCS (12.04.1951 – 13.10.1954)
 Leopold James Seneviratne, CCS  (14.10.1954 – 14.08.1956)
 Samson Felix Amarasinghe, OBE, CCS  (15.08.1956 – 31.05.1961 )
 Hamilton Shirley Amerasinghe, CCS  (01.06.1961 – 10.10.1963)
 H. E. Tennekoone, CCS (11.06.1963 – 18.12.1963) 
 H J Samarakkody, CAS (19.12.1963 – 14.11.1968)
 M. Rajendra, CAS  (15.11.1968 – 06.05.1971)
 C.A. Corray, SLAS (17.05.1971 – 01.07.1975)
 Dr. L R Jayewardena (16.07.1975 – 08.03.1978)
 Dr. W M Thilakeratne (28.03.1978 – 04.02.1987)
 B Mahadeva (05.02.1987 – 19.07.1987)
 C Chanmugam (20.07.1987 – 31.12.1988)
 R. Paskaralingam (04.01.1989 – 18.01.1994)
 N V K K Weragoda (19.01.1994 – 18.08.1994)
 A. S. Jayawardene (19.08.1994 – 07.11.1995)
 B C Perera (08.01.1996 – 31.01.1998)
 Dixon Nilaweera, SLAS (16.03.1998 – 01.11.1999)
 Dr. P.B. Jayasundera (01.11.1999 – 18.12.2001)
 J Charitha Ratwatte (19.12.2001 – 02.04.2004)
 Dr. P.B. Jayasundera (19.04.2004 – 17.09.2008) 
 S Abeysinghe, SLAS  (17.09.2008 – 2009)
 Dr. P.B. Jayasundera (2009 – 2015)
 Dr. R.H.S Samaratunga (2015 – 2019)
 S. R. Attygalle (2019 – )

See also
 Minister of Finance, Economic Stabilization and National Policies

References

External links
 Government of Sri Lanka
 Official Website of the Treasury of Sri Lanka
  The Lakshman Kadirgamar Institute of International Relations and Strategic Studies
  A Sri Lankan Diplomatic Success Story in the 18th Century

Finance
Sri Lanka, Finance
Sri Lanka
Sri Lanka
1947 establishments in Ceylon
Finance in Sri Lanka